Paspalidium (watercrown grass) is a genus of tropical and subtropical plants in the grass family.

Paspalidium includes about 40 species native to tropical and subtropical regions of Asia, Africa, Australia, and the Americas. They are annuals and perennials. Many species were formerly included in genus Setaria, and some authorities continue to list them there.

 Species

 formerly included
see Holcolemma Setaria Whiteochloa 
 Paspalidium inaequale - Holcolemma dispar
 Paspalidium punctatum var. longiglume - Setaria media
 Paspalidium semitonsum - Whiteochloa semitonsa

References

External links
 Grassbase - The World Online Grass Flora

Poaceae genera
Panicoideae